Elegant Weapons is a metal supergroup composed of bassist Rex Brown of Pantera, guitarist Richie Faulkner and drummer Scott Travis, both from Judas Priest, and vocalist Ronnie Romero of Rainbow. The band announced their formation on 25 October 2022.

Horns for a Halo
The band's debut album, Horns for a Halo, produced by Andy Sneap, is set to be released on 26 May 2023 by Nuclear Blast. The debut single, "Blind Leading the Blind", came out on 24 February 2023.

Band members
 Richie Faulkner – guitars (2022–present)
 Rex Brown – bass (2022–present)
 Ronnie Romero – vocals (2022–present)
 Scott Travis – drums (2022–present)

Discography
 Horns for a Halo (2023)

References

Heavy metal supergroups